Christo van Rensburg (born 23 October 1962) is a former professional tennis player from South Africa.

Van Rensburg turned professional in 1983. He won his first doubles title on ATP Tour later that year at Cleveland.

Van Rensburg won 20 top-level doubles titles during his career, including one Grand Slam men's doubles title at the Australian Open in 1985, partnering Paul Annacone. He also won two ATP singles titles at Orlando in 1987, and at Johannesburg in 1989. Van Rensburg's career-high rankings were world No. 19 in singles (achieved in 1988) and world No. 5 in doubles (achieved in 1987). He retired from the professional tour in 1995.

Van Rensburg is one of only two men to beat Pete Sampras in straight sets at Wimbledon (doing so in 1990, where Sampras was the No. 12 seed), the other being 1996 champion Richard Krajicek.

ATP career finals

Singles: 6 (2 titles, 4 runner-ups)

Doubles: 32 (20 titles, 12 runners-up)

ATP Challenger and ITF Futures finals

Singles: 6 (5–1)

Doubles: 8 (6–2)

Performance timelines

Singles

Doubles

Mixed doubles

External links
 
 
 

1962 births
Living people
People from Uitenhage
South African people of Dutch descent
Afrikaner people
Hopman Cup competitors
Olympic tennis players of South Africa
South African male tennis players
Tennis players at the 1992 Summer Olympics
Grand Slam (tennis) champions in men's doubles
Australian Open (tennis) champions
Sportspeople from the Eastern Cape